Chris Cooper Norman (born May 25, 1962 in Albany, Georgia) is a former punter in National Football League. He played his entire 3-year career for the Denver Broncos.

External links
NFL.com player page

1962 births
Living people
Sportspeople from Albany, Georgia
American football punters
South Carolina Gamecocks football players
Denver Broncos players
Players of American football from Georgia (U.S. state)